Rocky Mountain wolf may refer to:

 Gray wolf (Canis lupus) found in the Rocky Mountains
 Northern Rocky Mountain wolf (Canis lupus irremotus)
 Southern Rocky Mountain wolf (Canis lupus youngi)

See also
 Mountain wolf or Dhole
 Mountain wolf (disambiguation)
 Rocky Mountain (disambiguation)
 Wolf (disambiguation)

Animal common name disambiguation pages